Mohammad Fikri bin Che Soh (born 1 February 1998) is a Malaysian professional footballer who plays for Malaysia Super League club Kedah Darul Aman as a goalkeeper.

Club career

Kelantan
Fikri began his career playing for Kelantan youth team. He has been promoted into senior team and made his debut for Kelantan in 1—1 draw against Negeri Sembilan on 14 April 2018.

Career statistics

Club

References

External links
 

Living people
1998 births
People from Kelantan
Malaysian people of Malay descent
Malaysian footballers
Kelantan F.C. players
Kelantan United F.C. players
Kedah Darul Aman F.C. players
Association football goalkeepers
Malaysia Super League players